Diego Lima do Nascimento (born 24 April 1986) is a Brazilian footballer. He currently plays as goalkeeper for Santa Cruz.

Honours
Winner
Campeonato Pernambucano: 2011, 2012

References

External links
 
 

Brazilian footballers
Club Athletico Paranaense players
Santa Cruz Futebol Clube players
Association football goalkeepers
Sportspeople from Piauí
1986 births
Living people